"The Winslow Boy" was an American television play broadcast by CBS on November 13, 1958, as part of the television series, DuPont Show of the Month. It was based on the play by Terence Rattigan. Alex Segal was the director and David Susskind the producer. Frederic March starred as Arthur Winslow and was nominated for a Sylvania Award for his performance.

Plot
The play was on the Archer-Shee Case, a famous case heard in 1910. A 14-year-old boy, Ronnie Winslow, is unjustly accused of stealing a five shilling postal order and expelled from the Royal Naval College, Osborne.  His father, Arthur Winslow (played by Frederic March) hires a famous solicitor who successfully proves the boy's innocence and clears his name. (The real-life Winslow Boy was subsequently killed in World War I at age 19.)

Cast
The cast included performances by:

 Frederic March as Arthur Winslow
 Florence Eldridge as Grace Winslow
 Rex Thompson as Ronnie Winslow
 Denholm Elliott as John Watherstone
 Peter Bathurst as Desmond Curry
 Siobhan McKenna as Catherine Winslow
 Noel Willman as Sir Robert Norton
 Norah Howard as Violet
 John Milligan as Dickie
 Guy Spall as Attorney General
 Jean Cameron as Postmistress
 Pat Nye as Miss Barnes

Production
The production starred Frederic March and his real-life wife Florence Eldridge as the Winslow boy's parents. The program was an adaptation of the play by Terence Ratigan. David Susskind was the producer and Alex Segal the director.

For his performance as Arthur Winslow, March was nominated for outstanding actor at the 1958 Sylvania Television Awards.

Reception
In The New York Times, Jack Gould gave the production a positive review.

References

1958 television plays
American television films